This is a list of 18th-century British children's literature illustrators:

 Thomas Bewick (1753–1828)
 William Blake (1757–1827)

See also 
 List of 18th-century British children's literature authors
 List of 18th-century British children's literature titles

 Illustrators
Lists of children's books
children's literature illustrators 18th-century
Lists of 18th-century people
Lists of British books